Robert Ledesma (1901–1966) was an Argentine writer. La Llama, a collection of his poems, was published in 1954.

References

1901 births
1966 deaths
Argentine male poets
Date of birth missing
Place of birth missing
Date of death missing
Place of death missing